River Deep – Mountain High is a studio album by Ike & Tina Turner. It was originally released by London Records in the UK in 1966, and later A&M Records in the US in 1969. In 2017, Pitchfork ranked it at No. 40 on their list of the 200 Best Albums of the 1960s.

Background and recording 
After watching Ike & Tina Turner perform in a club on the Sunset Strip, producer Phil Spector invited them to perform on The Big T.N.T Show in 1965. Spector wanted to produce for Tina Turner and sign the duo to his Philles label. He negotiated a deal with Ike Turner for creative control over his sessions with Tina Turner, but Ike & Tina Turner were still signed to Loma Records, a subsidiary of Warner Bros. Records. Spector negotiated a deal with their manager Bob Krasnow, also head of Loma, offering $20,000 to have them released from their contract. Spector signed Ike & Tina Turner and the Ikettes to his label in April 1966.

By the time Ike & Tina Turner signed to Philles, the album had already been recorded at Gold Star Studios in March 1966. Phil Spector produced six songs using his wall of sound technique, including the title track, which was the first of three singles. Ike Turner produced the remaining tracks which are mostly re-recordings of Ike & Tina Turner's earlier hits. The Ikettes, which included P.P. Arnold, provided backing vocals on the Turner produced side of the album.

The first single "River Deep – Mountain High" was released in May 1966 and peaked at No. 88 on Billboard Hot 100. The single was a hit in Europe, reaching No. 3 in the UK and No. 1 in Spain. The second single, "I'll Never Need More Than This", was not included on the original album. It missed the Billboard Hot 100, peaking at No. 115 on Bubbling Under the Hot 100. It reached No. 64 in the UK. Tina Turner promoted the single on American Bandstand in 1967. The third single, "A Love Like Yours (Don't Come Knocking Everyday)", reached No. 16 in the UK.

Releases

1966 
River Deep – Mountain High  was intended to be released on Phil Spector's Philles label as LP-4011 in the US, but it was shelved when the single "River Deep – Mountain High" did not do well on the charts. Only a few copies of LP-4011 were pressed, the covers never printed, before it was canceled by Philles. However, the single was successful in England. By popular demand, Spector released the album in the UK with liner notes written by Decca's promotion man Tony Hall. Hall included a quote from Spector stating, "We can only assume that England is more appreciative of talent and exciting music than the U.S." Actor Dennis Hopper shot the cover of the album. The album peaked at No. 27 in the UK.

1969 
The album was eventually released in the United States when it was reissued by A&M Records in 1969. The reissue has a slightly different track listing. It substitutes "You're So Fine" with "I'll Never Need More Than This," which was released as a non-album track in 1967. Upon its release in the US, the album reached No. 102 on the Billboard 200 and No. 28 on the R&B Albums chart.

Critical reception 

Billboard (September 13, 1969):

Reissues 
The album was reissued on CD by A&M in 1987. It has since been reissued on CD by various labels, most recently Universal Music in 2018.

Track listing

Personnel
Credits adapted from liner notes.

 Tina Turnervocals
 Barney Kessel, Don Peake, John Ewing, Robert Gerstlauerguitar
 Jimmy Bondstring bass
 Carol Kaye, Ray Pohlman, Lyle RitzFender bass
 Harold Battiste, Larry Knechtel, Ike Turner, Michael Rubinipiano
 Jim Gordon, Earl Palmerdrums
 Frank Capp, Gene Estespercussion
 Roy Caton, Oliver Mitchelltrumpet
 John Ewing, Lew McCrearytrombone
 Plas Johnson, Jim Horn, Jim Miglioritenor sax
 Robert Gerstlauer, Jim Hornbaritone sax
The Ikettes, Ike Turnerbacking vocals
 Phil Spectorproducer, tracks 1,3,6,7,8, and 10 (reissue version)
 Ike Turnerproducer, tracks 2,4,5,9,11, and 12 (reissue version)
 Jack Nitzsche, Gene Page, Perry Botkin Jr.arrangers
 Larry Levineengineer
 Dennis Hopperphotography

Charts

References

External links
 

1966 albums
Ike & Tina Turner albums
London Records albums
A&M Records albums
Albums arranged by Jack Nitzsche
Albums arranged by Gene Page
Albums arranged by Perry Botkin Jr.
Albums produced by Phil Spector
Albums produced by Ike Turner
Albums recorded at Gold Star Studios